Must've Been High is the fourth studio album and the first cowpunk album by the American rock and roll band Supersuckers. It was released on March 25, 1997, via Sub Pop.

Track listing
"Must've Been High" – 3:28
"Dead in the Water" – 2:14
"Barricade" – 3:23
"Roamin' 'Round" – 3:05
"Hungover Together" – 4:06
"Non-Addictive Marijuana" – 2:47
"The Captain" – 3:06
"Blow You Away" – 1:54
"Roadworn and Weary" – 3:30
"Hangin' Out with Me" – 2:21
"Juicy Pureballs" – 1:52
"One Cigarette Away" – 2:50
"Hangliders" – 5:27

Notes
"Hungover Together" is a duet with Kelley Deal of The Breeders.
"The Captain" documents The Supersuckers' unsuccessful attempt to record with Captain Sensible of The Damned.
The last track also includes the song "Supersucker Drive By Blues."

References

Supersuckers albums
1997 albums
Sub Pop albums